David Kurnia Albert Dorfel, usually referred to as David Noah, is an Indonesian musician. He is the keyboardist of Indonesian rock band Noah since 2008 after becoming their additional musician in 2006.

Career

Noah 
David became Peterpan's (now Noah) additional keyboardist in 2006. According to David, he was invited to jam in a studio and only upon arriving that he was told that he will be auditioning to be Peterpan's keyboardist. Since David was originally a pianist rather than a keyboardist, he learned how to sample the day before the audition and borrowed a keyboard with a sampler from a friend for the audition.

In 2008, David became their official keyboardist. Not long after, Peterpan stopped using that name and temporary performed as Ariel, Uki, Lukman, Reza, and David. Under their temporary name, the band released instrumental album Suara Lainnya. The band announced their new name, Noah, in 2012.

For Noah's first album under that name, Seperti Seharusnya, David wrote two songs with Noah's additional bassist Ihsan. The first is "Separuh Aku", which was released as Noah's first single. The second is "Tak Lagi Sama", which was released as the album's fourth single.

Outside Noah 
Fellow Indonesian band D'Masiv brought David to play on their and Rossa's song "Pernah Memiliki", which was released as a single in April 2018. The reason from D'Masiv is that they want piano to be played on the song, but there was no pianist in their band.

In 2021, David collaborated with Indonesian singer Christie on her single "Walau Ku Jauh". According to Christie, many Noah fans had asked David to wrote a song for her. The song's arrangement went through several changes by David in order to make it fit Christie's vocals better.

Outside music 
On 5 August 2021, David was reported to the police by Lina Yunita for fraud. Lina's representatives said that Lina loaned Rp1.1 billion to David for a ship-construction business, but David did not return the money as dealt. On 13 August, David's lawyer said that David was the communication director in the company so he had no right to return the company's money, and David said that the business project was canceled due to COVID-19 pandemic and other people in the company left him to take care of the debt alone. Lina dropped the charges on 10 September 2021, after David paid back the money in cash without the company's involvement.

Personal life

Gallstone operation 
In June 2011, David underwent a gallstone operation operated by Dr. Reno. David fell ill after the operation and it was found out that his bile duct is damaged. On 14 May 2012, David reported Reno to the police for malpractice. After investigation, the police closed the case on 26 November 2012, saying that Reno did everything according to the procedure and what happened to David is a medical risk.

Due to the bile duct damage, David is admitted to a hospital in Singapore for another treatment in November 2012. While recovering from the operation, David is absent from Noah's concert, and the filming for Seperti Seharusnya karaoke DVD. By February 2013, David has rejoined the band, while still in the recovery process.

Discography 

 "Pernah Memiliki" (with D'Masiv and Rossa) (2018)
 "Walau Ku Jauh" (with Christie) (2021)

Accolades

References

External links 
 

Living people
Year of birth missing (living people)
Indonesian musicians
Noah (band) members